Girl with Hyacinths is a 1950 Swedish drama film written and directed by Hasse Ekman, starring Eva Henning, Ulf Palme, Anders Ek and Birgit Tengroth. It follows a man who investigates the mysterious life of his neighbour who has committed suicide.

Plot

A young woman is playing the piano at a wild party. When asked to play a special tune, she begins but stops abruptly and rushes out, visibly upset. Alone she starts to walk home through late night central Stockholm. Crossing a bridge, she has a conversation with a drunk artist, and after his persuasion, out of kindness, she gives him money for the sketch, but does not take it. Arriving at her apartment, she straps a rope to the ceiling and hangs herself. The next morning her body is found by a housekeeper.

The police arrives and ask questions to her neighbours. The young woman's name was Dagmar Brink, and she was something of a loner. Nobody knew much about her, although she had lived for a while in the building, but everyone states that she seemed like a sweet and nice girl. Her closest neighbours in the flat next door, writer Anders Wikner and his wife Britt, are both shocked by the girl's suicide. Soon Anders starts to investigate what happened. He contacts the few people who knew her and asks them questions. He meets artist Elias Körner who painted a portrait of her, an old bank manager who had a cold meeting with her, a woman who shared a room with her once, an ex-husband, and the singer whose party she attended the night of the suicide. Anders' wife also turns out to have a story about Dagmar and what happened one night in Dagmar's apartment. The different people's meetings with Dagmar are told in several flashbacks.

Cast
 Eva Henning as Dagmar Brink
 Ulf Palme as Anders Wikner
 Birgit Tengroth as Britt Wikner
 Anders Ek as Elias Körner
 Marianne Löfgren as Gullan Wiklund
 Gösta Cederlund as banker
 Karl-Arne Holmsten as Willy Borge
 Keve Hjelm as Captain Brink
 Anne-Marie Brunius as Alex

Production
Principal photography took place from 20 October to 3 December 1949 in Sandrew's studios with exterior scenes in Stockholm.

References

External links
 
 

1950 films
1950 drama films
Films directed by Hasse Ekman
Lesbian-related films
Swedish drama films
1950s Swedish-language films
Swedish LGBT-related films
1950s LGBT-related films
Swedish black-and-white films
Films set in Stockholm
Films shot in Stockholm
1950s Swedish films